New Salem is an unincorporated community in Noble Township, Rush County, in the U.S. state of Indiana.

History
New Salem was platted in 1831. A post office was established at New Salem in 1831, and remained in operation until it was discontinued in 1943.

Geography

References

Unincorporated communities in Rush County, Indiana
Unincorporated communities in Indiana